Tim O'Shea (born 1978 or '79) is a South African rugby footballer who represented his country in the 2000 Rugby League World Cup.

Playing career
O'Shea originally played rugby union for Griquas.

In 2000 he played for South Africa in the 2000 Rugby League World Cup.

In 2003 he signed with the Coventry R.F.C. in England.

References

Living people
South African rugby league players
South Africa national rugby league team players
South African people of Irish descent
Rugby league fullbacks
South African rugby union players
Rugby union centres
Coventry R.F.C. players
1970s births
Year of birth missing (living people)
Place of birth missing (living people)
South African expatriate rugby union players
Expatriate rugby union players in England
South African expatriate sportspeople in England
White South African people